Wurmbea murchisoniana is a species of plant in the Colchicaceae family that is endemic to Australia.

Description
The species is a cormous perennial herb that grows to a height of 10–26 cm. Its white flowers appear from July to September.

Distribution and habitat
The species is found in the Avon Wheatbelt, Coolgardie, Geraldton Sandplains, Murchison and Yalgoo IBRA bioregions of Western Australia. It grows in clay, sandy clay and loam soils, where there are gilgais or rock pools.

References

murchisoniana
Monocots of Australia
Angiosperms of Western Australia
Plants described in 1986
Taxa named by Terry Desmond Macfarlane